South Western Motorway may refer to:
 M5 South-West Motorway, in Sydney, New South Wales, Australia
 South Western Freeway, the former name for Hume Motorway in Sydney, New South Wales, Australia
 Southwestern Motorway, in Auckland, New Zealand